The Swansea Bay City Region,  is a city region in Wales.  It is a partnership between the local authorities of Carmarthenshire, Neath Port Talbot, Pembrokeshire and Swansea, local businesses in southwest Wales and other organisations with the support of the Welsh Government.  The Swansea Bay City Region is coterminous with the area defined as South West Wales.

Historical background
Local authorities in the South West Wales area made a bid for city region status during early 2012. A report to the Welsh Government in July 2012 recommended the creation of city regions in Wales to help improve economic performance compared with the rest of the United Kingdom.
The Swansea Bay City Region was launched in July 2013 following a consultation period by the Welsh Government resulting in a report recommending its creation.  The launch event was held at Parc y Scarlets where the Swansea Bay City Region Economic Regeneration Strategy was presented which identified several key economic areas to develop.  Sir Terry Matthews has been appointed chairman of the Swansea Bay City Region Board.

Tidal power
There is a plan to build a barrage across Swansea Bay and direct water from the incoming and outgoing tides through turbines to generate electricity from tidal power as a form of renewable energy. The project's backers require the UK government to guarantee the price of the electricity it generates.  this guarantee has not been forthcoming.

See also
South West Wales
Cardiff Capital Region
Regional economy in Wales

References

External links
Swansea Bay City Region
Swansea Bay City Region on Twitter
Swansea Bay City Region on Facebook

 
Economy of Swansea
Regionalism (politics) in the United Kingdom